John Sigvard "Ole" Olsen (November 6, 1892 – January 26, 1963) was an American vaudevillian and comedian.

Biography
Olsen was married twice. He had four children with his first wife, Lillian Clem: John Charles, Robert Clem, Joy, and Moya. They were later divorced. His son, Robert died of miliary tuberculosis at age 2; son J. C., an actor, died by suicide in 1956. Moya married William P. Lear of Learjet fame in 1942. Ole was involved in a serious automobile accident in 1950 and recuperated at the Lear home. In June 1961 Ole married Eileen Maria Osthoff, a dancer and choreographer he had known for eight years.

Olsen's ambition was to make people laugh. He is remembered for the quote, "May you live as long as you laugh, and laugh as long as you live", which are cited on his headstone. Olsen died in Albuquerque, New Mexico at the age of 70 of a kidney ailment, and is interred in Palm Desert Memorial in Las Vegas, Nevada, in a grave adjoining that of Chic Johnson.

References

External links

 
 Charles Stumpf Olsen and Johnson - The Zaniest of the Zanies from Classic Images
Ole Olsen Memorial Theatre

"Ole Olsen Papers, 1910-1999, Collection Guide", Indiana Historical Society

1892 births
1963 deaths
20th-century American comedians
Northwestern University School of Communication alumni
People from Peru, Indiana
Vaudeville performers
American people of Norwegian descent
Deaths from kidney disease